The Grand Lodge of Texas, Ancient Free and Accepted Masons is the largest of several governing bodies of Freemasonry in the State of Texas, being solely of the Ancients' tradition and descending from the Ancient Grand Lodge of England, founded on 17 June 1751 at the Turk's Head Tavern, Greek Street, Soho, London. According to historian James D. Carter, the "Grand Lodge of the Republic of Texas, A.F. & A.M." was founded on 16 April 1838. However, its first Grand Master and other grand officers were installed by Sam Houston on 11 May 1838. The Grand Lodge of Texas is one of the largest in the world, reporting 69,099 members in 2019. The current Grand Lodge of Texas facilities were made possible by the fundraising efforts of Waco Masonic Lodge No. 92.

History

Early History of Freemasonry
Freemasonry has its historic origins among the early lodges of stonemasons and architects that, utilizing the style of Gothic architecture, built the cathedrals of Middle Ages. They were called "Freemasons" because they were free men and not serfs, their lodges were free from taxation, and they worked in freestone, a type of quarry stone. During the 17th century, lodges in Scotland began "accepting" members who were not operative stonemasons. The acceptance of these gentlemen Freemasons gave rise to the name "Free and Accepted Masons." In their ceremonies of passing from one degree to another they inculcated a system of morality, veiled in allegory and illustrated by the symbols and tools of their craft. During the 18th century, lodges formed grand lodges to govern the craft. No longer operative as of old, Masonic lodges continued without interruption to observe the customs and traditions of the fraternity for the "benefit of mankind."

Freemasonry in America
The early American colonial lodges were chartered by the grand lodges of Europe. Many of the founders of the United States and their allies were Freemasons:  George Washington, Benjamin Franklin, John Hancock, Paul Revere, John Paul Jones, the Marquis de Lafayette, Baron von Steuben and others. Washington was the Master of Alexandria Lodge No. 22 when he consecrated the cornerstone (see "foundation stone") of the United States Capitol in 1793.

Early Masonry in Texas
On 11 February 1828, Stephen F. Austin called a meeting of Masons at San Felipe de Austin for the purpose of petitioning the York Grand Lodge of Mexico for a charter to form a lodge. Although the petition reached Matamoros, and was to be forwarded to Mexico City, nothing more was heard of it. By 1828 the ruling faction in Mexico City feared that the liberal elements in Texas might attempt to gain independence, and being aware of the political philosophies of English-speaking Freemasons, the Mexican government outlawed Freemasonry on 25 October of that year. The following year, Austin called another meeting of Masons who, in an attempt to alleviate the fears of the Mexican government, decided it was "impolitic and imprudent, at this time, to form Masonic lodges in Texas."

In March 1835, five Master Masons met "in a little grove of peach or laurel" at the town of Brazoria, "near a place known as General John Austin's," and resolved to petition Grand Master John H. Holland of the Grand Lodge of Louisiana asking for a dispensation to form a lodge in Texas. Foremost among these five Masons was Anson Jones who would later serve as Grand Master, and as President of the Republic of Texas.

That charter, creating Holland Lodge No. 1, was issued and signed on 27 January 1835. It was given to a Mr. John M. Allen, originally of Louisiana Lodge No. 32 to carry to Texas. Allen had been recruiting volunteers for the Texas Army in New Orleans, and would not reach Texas until just before the Battle of San Jacinto on 21 April 1836.

Freemasons and the Texas Revolution

Meanwhile, Texas was in the midst of war. The first shots of the Texas Revolution had been fired in October 1835 at Gonzales. Delegates had gathered at the small town of Washington-on-the-Brazos and signed the Texas Declaration of Independence on 2 March 1836. The Mexican Army under General Antonio Lopez de Santa Anna had crossed the Rio Grande and attacked and defeated the small garrison at the Alamo in San Antonio de Bexar. Among the nearly 200 defenders who died at the Alamo were Freemasons James Bonham, James Bowie, David Crockett, Almaron Dickenson, and William Barrett Travis.

There has existed for many years the story or myth that General Santa Anna, captured on 21 April 1836 after the defeat of the Mexican Army after the Battle of San Jacinto, was able to save himself from execution by giving secret "Masonic signs" when he was captured, and again when he was brought before General Sam Houston. Texas historian James D. Carter recorded in his book, Masonry in Texas, that "Texas Masons contemporary with [the Battle of] San Jacinto stated emphatically that Santa Anna 'filled the air' with Masonic signs after his capture and had given a Masonic grip to Houston." C.R. Wharton, in his book, El Presidente, stated that "Santa Anna, fearing for his life, gave the Masonic distress signal to John A. Wharton." Santa Anna probably knew the appropriate grips and signs, since he was a member of the Scottish Rite in Mexico, which had become dominated by men devoted to Mexican government centralization. Within Mexico, opposition to the centralists found itself organized around Mexico's York Rite establishment, although by 1833, both had mostly been displaced in popularity by a "Mexican National Rite", although Santa Anna kept his Scottish Rite associates around him. Whether or not this specifically saved his life is not clear. What is certain is that Santa Anna was worth more to Texas alive than dead. President Andrew Jackson, a member of the same Masonic lodge as Sam Houston, Cumberland Lodge No. 8 at Nashville, Tennessee, wrote to Houston and implored him to spare Santa Anna's life, reminding Houston that "while he is in your power, the difficulties of your enemy, in raising another army, will be great.... Let not his blood be shed, unless imperious necessity demands it.... Both wisdom and humanity enjoin this course in relation to Santa Anna."

Grand Lodge of the Republic of Texas
The Masonic Convention of December 1837:  By the end of 1837, three lodges had been chartered in Texas by the Grand Lodge of Louisiana:  Holland Lodge No. 1 which had moved to the city of Houston, Milam Lodge No. 2 at Nacogdoches, and McFarland Lodge No. 3 at San Augustine. On 20 December 1837, Sam Houston, President of the Republic of Texas, presided over a convention meeting in the city of Houston consisting of the representatives of these three lodges. The representatives were:  From Holland Lodge:  Sam Houston, Anson Jones, Jeff Wright, and Thomas G. Western;  from Milam Lodge: Thomas J. Rusk, I. W. Burton, Charles S. Taylor, Adolphus Sterne, and K. H. Douglas; and from McFarland Lodge:  G. H. Winchell was delegated to represent McFarland Lodge. The representatives there assembled resolved to form a "Grand Lodge of the Republic of Texas," and to that end they elected Anson Jones as the first Grand Master of Masons in Texas, and other officers. After approving a resolution that the first meeting of the Grand Lodge should be held "on the third Monday of April next," the convention was then adjourned. It is clear from the minutes of this convention that, although a Grand Master was elected, he was not yet installed, and although a resolution to form a Grand Lodge was approved by the convention, it had not yet done so. The birthdate of the new Grand Lodge was still four months away.

The Grand Lodge is Born - 16 April 1838:  As the delegates to the previous convention had agreed, they met again on the third Monday, the 16th of April 1838 in the city of Houston, although only three of the six elective grand officers were in attendance:  the Grand Master-elect, the Senior Grand Warden-elect, and the Grand Treasurer-elect. Nevertheless, the minutes state that the "Grand Lodge was opened in ample form," and, according to Texas historian James D. Carter, "the jurisdiction of the Grand Lodge of Louisiana was ended," making 16 April 1838 the birthdate of the Grand Lodge of the Republic of Texas. It may be of some historical interest to note that three and one-half weeks later, on 11 May 1838, the Grand Lodge met again and installed the Grand Master and his officers. As a result, this latter date, 11 May 1838, is the birthdate of the Grand Lodge given in Coil's Masonic Encyclopedia.<ref>Coil, Henry W. (1961).  Article:  "Texas", p. 651.  Coil's Masonic Encyclopedia (rev. ed. 1996). Richmond, Va: Macoy Publ. Co.</ref>

Early Texas Lodges
The following is a list of 26 lodges that were organized before 19 February 1846, during the Republic of Texas period, and under the Grand Lodge of the Republic of Texas. They are listed along with their final charter dates and original locations:

  - Demised.
  - Demised, but charter restored at or near original location.
  - Now working as Redland Lodge No. 3.
  - Demised 1847, but Charter Restored 2 Aug 2006 at West Columbia, TX.
  - Demised, but charter restored Dec 2005 near Sealy, TX.

Famous Texas Freemasons
 Stephen F. Austin - Father of Texas - Louisiana Lodge No. 109, Ste. Genevieve, Mo.
 Sam Houston - Hero of San Jacinto - Holland Lodge No. 1, Houston, Tx.  Cumberland Lodge No. 8, Nashville, Tn.
 William Barret Travis - The Defender of the Alamo - Alabama Lodge No. 3
 James Bowie - The Greatest Fighter in the Southwest - Loge L'Humble Chaumiere No. 19, Opelousas, La.
 David Crockett - King of the Wilderness - (lodge unknown - his Masonic apron, entrusted to the Sheriff of Weakley Co., Tn., has survived with the family of E. M. Taylor of Paducah, Ky.)
 James Bonham - Alamo Defender and last messenger to leave the Alamo and return - (So. Carolina lodge records destroyed by fire in 1838)
 James Fannin - Commander at Goliad - Holland Lodge No. 36, Brazoria, Tx.
 Anson Jones - Last President of the Republic of Texas - Holland Lodge No. 1, Houston, Tx.  Harmony Lodge No. 52, Phila. Pa.
 Lorenzo de Zavala - First Vice-President of the Republic - Logia Independencia No. 454 (Gr. Ldg. of New York), Mexico City.
 Jose Navarro - Texas Patriot and Legislator - American Virtue Lodge No. 10, Saltillo, Mexico.
 Juan Seguin - Tejano Patriot - Holland Lodge No. 1, Houston, Tx.
 Lawrence S. "Sul" Ross - Texas Ranger, Confederate General, Governor of Texas, President of Texas A&M - Waco Lodge No. 92, Waco.
 John J. Kennedy - "Sheriff, leader of law and order faction of the Regulator-Moderator War, Confederate Captain" - Marshall Lodge No. 22, Marshall, Tx.
 R.E.B. Baylor - Founder of Baylor University - Baylor Lodge No. 125, Gay Hill, Tx.
 Benjamin F. Terry - Founder and Commander of Terry's Texas Rangers - Holland Lodge No. 1, Houston.
 Thomas S. Lubbock - Commander of Terry's Texas Rangers - Holland Lodge No. 1, Houston.
 Charles Goodnight - Plainsman and Cattleman - Phoenix Lodge No. 275, Weatherford, Tx.
 Jimmie Rodgers - The Singin' Brakeman, Father of Country Music - Blue Bonnet Lodge No. 1219, San Antonio, Tx.
 Audie Murphy - Most Decorated American Soldier of World War II - No. Hollywood Lodge No. 542
 Gene Autry - The Singing Cowboy Claire Chennault - Founder of the Flying Tigers Edwin E. "Buzz" Aldrin - 2nd Man on the Moon'' - Clear Lake Lodge No. 1417, El Lago, Tx
 James "Red" Duke - Chief of Trauma Center at Memorial Hermann Hospital, Houston, and the Creator of the Life Flight Helicopter System, the first air ambulance service in Texas. Hillsboro Lodge No. 196, Hillsboro, Tx.
 Hiram Abiff Boaz - Second President of Southern Methodist University and Member of Hillcrest Masonic Lodge in Dallas Texas
 (Jerry) Benét Embry, Radio Personality, Writer, Published Author, Actor, Director and Screenwriter, A.F.& A.M. - 32nd Degree Scottish Rite Master Mason and Member of Lebanon Lodge 837 in Frisco Texas

See also
Masonic Home Independent School District
 Alamo Lodge No. 44

Notes

External links
Grand Lodge of Texas official website
Texas Lodge of Research website
Texas Masonic Historical Markers
Texas Scottish Rite Hospital for Children official website
Tranquility Lodge: A Lodge Chartered for the Moon
Anson Jones - Texas Historical Marker Dedication Ceremony  November 21, 2009, Glenwood Cemetery, Houston, Texas.

Freemasonry in the United States
1838 establishments in the Republic of Texas